This is a list of songs that have a cover version in Czech:

English

Belgian

Bulgarian

Croatian

Czech

Dutch

French

German

Hungarian

Italian

Japanese

Neapolitan

Slovak

Spanish

Mexican

Polish

Puerto Rican

Romanian

Folk songs

In case of folk songs it is nearly meaningless trying to determine which version is original and which is a cover.

Polish

Sources 

Rádio Blaník: Slavné desky – HEZKY ČESKY list of episodes, (old archive version episodes from 2012, newer archive version episodes from 2013)

References 

Czech
Czech-language songs